Bertram W. Countryman (February 28, 1867 – February 15, 1946) was a member of the South Dakota House of Representatives and served one term, from 1903 until 1906 for the 11th district.

Biography
Countryman was born on February 28, 1867, in Grant County, Wisconsin. He moved to McCook County, South Dakota, in 1880. In 1889, he married Alice E. Parkhurst. In addition to his political activity, he was a grain dealer and organized Chautauqua assemblies.

Career
Countryman was a member of the South Dakota House of Representatives from 1903 to 1906. He was a Republican.

References

External links

1867 births
1946 deaths
Republican Party members of the South Dakota House of Representatives
People from Grant County, Wisconsin
People from McCook County, South Dakota